Whampoa is a romanisation of  / , and may refer to:

Mainland China
 Huangpu District, Guangzhou
 Pazhou, an island known historically as Whampoa
 Whampoa anchorage, the intermediate way station between Macao and Guangzhou
 Whampoa Military Academy, a military academy of the Republic of China in Guangzhou
 Whampoa Pagoda, in Guangzhou
 Treaty of Whampoa, a commercial treaty between France and China, concluded in 1844

Hong Kong
 Whampoa Dock, a Hong Kong dockyard operated in the Crown Colony of Hong Kong from 1863–1979
 Whampoa Garden, a private housing estate built in the 1980s located on part of the former site of the dock
 Whampoa station, terminal station on the Kwun Tong line of the MTR in Hong Kong
 Hutchison Whampoa, a Hong Kong conglomerate, the eventual owner of the Whampoa Dock, Whampoa Garden, A.S. Watson & Co., Superdrug, and Hutchison 3G

Singapore
 Whampoa, Singapore, a housing estate located in the district of Novena
 Hoo Ah Kay, a prominent 19th century Singaporean businessman and community leader.
 Whampoa Single Member Constituency, a former constituency represented by Heng Chee How that contains the housing estate of Whampoa along with other areas

See also 
Huangpu (disambiguation), the pinyin romanisation of the same Chinese characters